The Rebel Jesus is a film about the life of Jesus Christ. It was made in 1972 to capitalize on the concurrent release of the film versions of Jesus Christ Superstar and Godspell. It was a longtime passion project for Buchanan.

The Copper Scroll of Mary Magdalene

The film was subsequently recut by Buchanan in 2004 as The Copper Scroll of Mary Magdalene. He was working on it at the time of his death.

References

External links 
 
 The Copper Scroll of Mary Magdalene at BFI

1972 films
1972 drama films
Films directed by Larry Buchanan
1970s English-language films